"Deal with the Devil " is the second single from Onyx and is the eleventh single overall from American rock band Pop Evil.  The video, which was directed by Johan Carlén, is the second part of a trilogy that is being presented in reverse.  The song became the band's second number-one single, following their previous single "Trenches".

Premise 
The song and video are the second part of a trilogy that deals with substance abuse and dependency.  With respect to the song, drummer Chachi Riot stated that: "Life can be wonderful, but life can also be extremely merciless. How do we deal with these hard times? Who do we have to deal with? Our decisions have consequences."

Chart performance

References 

2013 singles
Pop Evil songs
2013 songs
Songs written by Dave Bassett (songwriter)
Song recordings produced by Johnny K
MNRK Music Group singles